Valeri Tsyganov (born 14 October 1956) is a Soviet former alpine skier who competed in the 1980 Winter Olympics and 1984 Winter Olympics.

External links
 sports-reference.com

1956 births
Living people
Soviet male alpine skiers
Olympic alpine skiers of the Soviet Union
Alpine skiers at the 1980 Winter Olympics
Alpine skiers at the 1984 Winter Olympics
People from Monchegorsk
Sportspeople from Murmansk Oblast